Young Arrows F.C. is football club from Zambia in Lusaka. They are a member of the Zambian Division One, and play their home games at Nkoloma Stadium.

Squad

Football clubs in Zambia
Sport in Lusaka
Division One